Sukaina Khan (born 28 May 1996) is a Pakistani actress and model. She is known for her roles in dramas Haya Ke Daaman Main, Jaal, Mehboob Aapke Qadmon Main, Mohabbat Daagh Ki Soorat, Choti Choti Batain and Fasiq. She is also known for her role in movie Tevar as Arifa.

Early life
Sukaina was born on May 28, 1996 in Karachi, Pakistan. She completed her studies from University of Karachi.

Career
She made her debut as an actress in 2012. She appeared in drama Teri Berukhi with Savera Nadeem and Sumbul Iqbal and in drama Aasmanon Pay Likha with Sajal Aly. She is best known for role of Zonia in drama Jaal with Ali Kazmi and Sumbul Iqbal for which she got known along with the role of Shazia in drama Mehboob Aapke Qadmon Main. She was also known for her lead role as Haya in drama Haya Ke Daaman Main with Maryam Nafees.

Filmography

Television

Anthology Series

Web series

Reality Shows

Telefilm

Film

Other appearance

Awards and nominations

References

External links
 
 
 

1996 births
Living people
Pakistani television actresses
21st-century Pakistani actresses
Pakistani film actresses